Fall to Grace is the second studio album by English recording artist Paloma Faith. It was released by RCA Records on 28 May 2012. She worked on the album with producer Nellee Hooper, who previously worked with artists such as Madonna, Björk, Massive Attack, and Gwen Stefani. Fall to Grace features production styles crossing the genres of pop, soul and R&B. The album was received positively by most critics. A deluxe edition was released the same day, which contains acoustic versions of five songs from the album.

The album's lead single was "Picking Up the Pieces", which was released on 20 May 2012 and peaked at number 7, making it Paloma's highest-charting single until "Only Love Can Hurt Like This" peaked at number 6. Fall to Grace peaked at number 2 in the UK and was certified Double Platinum by the British Phonographic Industry after selling more than 600,000 copies. Four more singles were released from the album, "30 Minute Love Affair", "Never Tear Us Apart", "Just Be" and "Black & Blue". Paloma embarked on her second tour in early 2013 to promote the album.

Background
Paloma revealed that she was working on a second album in March 2010. In July 2011, Paloma revealed that she did not know when the album was going to be completed and she branded the process "slow". She told Kristy Kelly of Digital Spy "The album's not finished yet and I'm not sure when it will be. If I had my way it would be out tomorrow, but there are so many other people involved that nothing happens quickly."

On 29 February 2012, Paloma revealed her second album would be called Fall to Grace and that it would be released by RCA Records on 28 May 2012. Paloma enlisted record producer Nellee Hooper and co-producer Jake Gosling to work with her on the project. Hooper told a writer for NME that he had not really heard of Paloma as he was living in Los Angeles when her first album was released. He said Sony and RCA Records contacted him and suggested he meet her. Paloma wrote and recorded the album in London. Paloma told an Australian magazine about the writing of the album: "What I did was start by leisurely writing songs at a slow pace, she says. I didn't think about the sonics or anything; I was just writing on a guitar or piano, it was just the bare bones. My management were nice about it. There was no pressure." It was announced that Fall to Grace is set to be reissued with new tracks on 22 October 2012. "Never Tear Us Apart" was released on 28 September 2012 as the first single from the reissued album and serves as the third single from the album overall.

Writing
"Agony" was written by Faith, Paddy Byrne, and Blair MacKichan. Faith also worked with the latter two for her debut single, "Stone Cold Sober". Byrne and MacKichan are also credited for original production of "Stone Cold Sober". Byrne is also credited for additional production. "Agony" was not released as a single. "Let Your Love Walk In" was written by Faith and Ed Harcourt, who worked with Faith on her third single, "Do You Want the Truth or Something Beautiful?". "Let Your Love Walk In" was not released as a single. "30 Minute Love Affair" was written by Faith and Chris Braide, who returned to work with Faith on her later album ("A Perfect Contradiction"), towards the song "Impossible Heart". Both songs used synthesized instrumentation. "Impossible Heart" was not released as a single. Francis "Eg" White worked with Faith twice on this album, towards the tracks "Black & Blue" and "Beauty of the End". Only the former was released as a single.

Concept and artwork
Paloma said that the album would contain more "agony and suffering" than her first album and hoped it would be made with one producer for a more "solid piece of work." She explained: "I love the beautiful side of things like that Tom Waitsy, Rufus Wainwrighty, Ed Harcourt sort of stuff, and in contrast I like all the OutKast production, Gnarls Barkley and 'Beggin' and all that sort of sound. Contemporary but with a nod to the past. But you never know. You might just meet someone and something else would make sense."
Of the album, Paloma stated "The new album has taken on a very cinematic mood. I am very excited to introduce my new sound into the world. Working with Nellee Hooper (Björk, Madonna) has been really inspirational." Paloma further commented on working with Hooper: 
He's the first person in the music industry that I've met who completely understands all my references .... Generally when I work, creatively my references are not musical, they're visual – from art or film. Nellie is the first person I've ever worked with who totally gets that because he's very much an art and film fan himself. In the past I felt misunderstood and had to kind of force-feed people pictures, or buy them DVDs and say, 'Go home and watch this'. He'd seen it all already. 
Paloma told Dom Gourlay of Contactmusic.com that Fall to Grace is a personal record about a period of her life. Likewise, Hooper said that working with Paloma reminded him of his work with Björk: "At lunch [Paloma Faith] sat and talked in such detail, as if every song was a short film, referencing everything from Chinese romantic cinema to Hip Hop."

In an interview with The Guardian Paloma referred to Fall to Grace as "a soundtrack to my last few years", and added: "Relationships with friends and family. Romances. I'd love to say that I could write political songs but I don't feel clued-up enough. I decided the next best thing would be socio-commentary, observing people." She said that she was a fan of Plan B's song "Ill Manors," about the 2011 riots across England, and so had attempted a track of her own dealing with similar issues. The Guardian interview further conveys, in the same connection:
She also revealed that she thought she'd make a video for the song, Black & Blue, a song from the album, that had her crooning during a riot… but a cackle, after she says this, seems to acknowledge it was a bad idea. Tricky concept to pull off without causing offence, and Paloma is sensitive about being seen as cut off or removed from the unrest that sparked 2011's troubles in her native Hackney. 
In another interview Paloma explained the title of album, saying that she "took the phrase fall from grace, which is usually when people have come from something good and screwed up. I decided that my life was the opposite. So it’s a positive message about turning some difficult situations into something better, happier and more peaceful. My experience of turning tragedy into hope." The artwork for the album was revealed on 11 April 2012. It features Paloma mid-air, draped in a flowing red dress (or blue dress on the deluxe edition), while surrounded by blue-and-yellow macaws. In a video posted to her Vevo channel on YouTube, Paloma described the concept as she is falling down into paradise, matching the album's theme of leaving sad situations and going into a hopeful situation.

Critical reception

The album has been received positively by most critics. Phil Johnson from The Independent had mixed response, said: "There's such a belt-and-braces approach that the array of sounds (strings, choirs, tubular bells, beats and synths, dubby blurbs and squeaks) can come across as overbearing, while Paloma's moody vocals are mannered by design". "But the biggest and best numbers – "Picking Up the Pieces", "Blood, Sweat & Tears"- achieve real grandeur". Robert Copsey from Digital Spy had a more positive review, telling: "There's no such worry on Fall To Grace which, at times, feels astonishingly honest. A shining example is lead single 'Picking Up The Pieces', an epic song about relationship neuroses that feels worthy of its own Adele moment". "Producer Nellee Hooper (Madonna, Bjork) and Jake Gosling (Ed Sheeran) remain at the helm throughout, creating sumptuous melodies on ballads 'Black & Blue' and 'Just Be' that are packed to the brim with old glamour". "Countering the slower moments are smoky disco numbers 'Blood Sweat & Tears' and '30 Minute Love Affair', the latter a Cyndi Lauper-meets-Drive number whose hooks dig much deeper than you'd expect. She scapes depressing us with her constant tales of relationship woes on the chorus of 'Freedom' which, despite the subject matter, has a wonderful gospel-like quality. That said, they're up against some seriously stellar competition – and while her collaborators may have an ear for a chorus, there's no question that Fall To Grace is unmistakably 'Paloma'".

A review from the Express by Simon Cage had a mixed response, he said: "Add world-class writers and producers with everyone from Adele to Madonna on their CVs and it’s no surprise that this is a high-quality outing". "The songs, though good, are over-sung while it just seems horribly unspontaneous". OSoM Blog mentions Fall to Grace as an album providing "over 40 minutes of enjoyable pop". Nick Levine from BBC, said: "Lead single Picking Up the Pieces is epic, like stallions galloping across the silver screen, and Fall to Grace has several other grand, cinematic ballads. However, Paloma and Hooper know that films aren't just about big Oscar-grabbing moments, so they vary the tone". "30 Minute Love Affair is Annie Lennox-style synth-pop. Let Me Down Easy works a kind of "supper club dub" sound. Agony seems to be rewriting Lana Del Rey's Video Games, but then decides to sound like Tori Amos covering Mr. Brightside. Phew! It takes two imperfect people to dance a sweet ballet," she sings on Blood, Sweat & Tears, offering a neat précis of the Paloma perspective: romantic but realistic. The quality slips towards the finish, but not enough to spoil a supremely accomplished second album". "Fall to Grace is proof that pop doesn't need to be grey and restrained to feel grown-up." Fall to Grace is nominated for best British Album at the 2013 Brit Awards.

Commercial performance
Fall to Grace debuted at number two on the UK Albums Chart for the week ending 2 June 2012, behind Gary Barlow's Sing. The position marked Paloma's highest-charting album with sales of 35,024. The following week, the album fell one place to number three with 14,373 copies sold. The album dropped to number five in its third week, selling 18,308 copies. The album rebounded to number three in its fourth week on the chart, with sales of 15,051 copies. The album spent a total of five consecutive weeks in the top ten since its release, before dropping from number ten to 11 in its sixth week on the chart. The album remained in the top twenty until its eleventh week when it ascended from number 16 to five. The following week it climbed even higher to match its peak position of two, remaining there for a second week. The album spent a further two weeks in the top ten before dropping to number 12 for the date issued 22 September 2012. By its nineteenth week on the chart, Fall to Grace still remained within the top twenty of the chart. The following week it saw a large decline to number 33. However, for the issue dated 3 November 2012, the album leaped from number 35 into the top ten at number nine, marking its eleventh total week in the top ten. It remained at the position the following week, and rose to number eight in its 24th total week on the chart.

As of 17 November 2012, the album has spent 13 weeks inside the top ten and has totaled 50 weeks in the UK Album Chart Top 100 as of 12 May 2013. The album has been certified Platinum by the British Phonographic Industry for sales of 300,000 copies. Fall To Grace was the 11th biggest selling album of 2012 according to official charts selling a total of 449,000 copies. On the Irish Albums Chart, Fall to Grace debuted at number 21 on 24 May 2012. The album re-entered the chart in its third week, reaching number ten. As of 13 September 2012, the album has spent 15 weeks on the chart in total. In Scotland, Fall to Grace debuted at number one for the issue dated 9 June 2012, becoming Paloma's first chart-topping album. The album has spent 27 weeks on the chart in total as of 8 December 2012. It has also charted in other European territories; in Switzerland at number 36 and Finland at 44. Furthermore, it has reached number 49 in Australia and 14 in New Zealand, spending one week on the chart in both countries.

Singles

The album's lead single, "Picking Up the Pieces", was released on 20 May 2012. It peaked at number seven on the UK Singles Chart becoming Faith's first top ten UK single. Paloma described the single as being about "...the issues of being in a relationship with someone who is still recovering from a previous relationship with another person. It is a song about self-doubt and insecurity." The single debuted at number 7 in the UK, becoming Paloma's highest-charting single. The music video was directed by Emil Nava. In describing the artwork for the single, she did so in homage of Marilyn Monroe who sometimes had a tragic look in her eyes while she overall appearing glamorous; Paloma attempted to achieve the same look of vulnerability and beauty, as if she was caught unprepared before she was heading to an event.

"30 Minute Love Affair" was released as the second single on 10 August 2012. Paloma stated that the song was written while remembering meeting a busker when she was 14, singing songs with him and falling a little in love, but she did not see him, again, even though he promised he would be back the next day. The artwork of the single reflects as it depicts a fantasy of what she believes it would have felt like if they met, again, and shows her in a dreamy setting about to kiss a man. The song's music video was directed by Emil Nava. Paloma's cover of INXS's "Never Tear Us Apart" was released as the third single on 28 September 2012 (the first single from the reissued and American versions of Fall to Grace). The song was featured in the UK television commercial for John Lewis, which began airing from 15 September 2012. It peaked in the UK Top 20.

"Just Be" was released as the fourth single from the album on 16 December 2012. Paloma described the song as showing her at her most vulnerable, as it is bare bones in being just her vocals accompanied by a piano. The artwork for the single depicts Paloma in a similar way, wearing very little make-up and exposing her imperfections while being at home with herself and her flaws.   "Black & Blue" was released in March 2013, as the fifth single from the album. A music video was released online. To promote the album, the acoustic version of "Black & Blue" was made available as a free download on the British Amazon MP3 store from 15 May 2012 until 3 July 2012.

Tour
In June 2012, Paloma announced details of a UK, Ireland and United States tour to promote Fall to Grace. The tour started in September, visiting United States, while the European leg started in Dublin on 21 January 2013. Paloma previously admitted that she did not want to tour Fall to Grace until her fans knew all of the words to the songs. In July 2012, Paloma added nine more dates to the tour.

Track listing

Notes
  signifies a co-producer

Personnel
Adapted from AllMusic.

 Roberto Angrisani – choir
 David Arnold – producer, string arrangements, background vocals
 Guy Barker – brass arrangement, string arrangements, trumpet
 Xavier Barnett – background vocals
 Dick Beetham – mastering
 Elisa Bergerson – viola
 Ellen Blair – violin
 Graeme Blevins – tenor saxophone
 Fiona Bonds – viola
 Natalia Bonner – violin
 John Bradbury – orchestra leader, violin
 Rachel Byrt – viola
 Eos Chater – violin
 Clare Connors – violin
 Nick Cooper – celli
 Sam Dixon – bass 
 Alison Dods – violin
 Liz Edwards – violin
 Dai Emmanuel – violin
 Paloma Faith – primary artist, vocals, background vocals
 Ghislaine Fleischmann – violin
 Simon Gogerly – mixing
 Larry Gold – cello, string arrangements
 Jake Gosling – bass, drums, keyboards, producer, programming, background vocals
 Timothy Grant – viola
 Isobel Griffiths – contractor
 Ed Harcourt – celeste, electric guitar, piano
 Roger Harvey – tenor trombone
 Margrit Hasler – viola
 Peter Honore – guitar, acoustic guitar, electric guitar
 Nellee Hooper – drums, keyboards, mixing, producer, programming, background vocals
 Denise Hudson – background vocals
 Andy Hughes – engineer
 Martin Humbey – viola
 Ian Humphries – violin
 Katherine Jenkinson – celli
 Janine Johnson – choir
 Magnus Johnston – violin
 Louise Keen – choir
 Olga Konopelsky – violin
 Rick Koster – violin
 Emma Kummrow – violin
 David Lale – celli
 Chris Laurence – bass
 Chris Leonard – guitar
 Mike Lovatt – trumpet
 Charlotte Matthews – contractor
 Rachel Matthews – choir
 Luigi Mazzochi – violin
 Lorraine McAslan – violin
 Dave Miles – engineer
 Naomi Miller – choir, background vocals
 Mark Nightingale – tenor trombone
 Vivian Nwonka – choir
 David Odlum – mixing, vocal engineer
 Ishia Osborne – choir
 Charles Parker – violin
 Helen Patterson – violin
 Adele Pentlan – choir
 Ladonna Harley Peters – background vocals
 Dom Pipkin – piano
 Dominic Pipkin – piano, background vocals
 Christopher J. Porter – design, layout
 David Powell – tuba
 Tim Powell – strings
 Richard Pryer – bass
 Tom Rees-Roberts – trumpet
 Carlos Rubio – violin
 Vanessa Samafu – choir
 Patrick Savage – violin
 William Schofield – celli
 Al Shux – drums, guitar, organ, piano, producer
 Darren Simpson – engineer
 Sonia Slany – violin
 Tiffany Smith – background vocals
 David Standish – photography
 Anna Szabo – violin
 Ed Tarrant – bass trombone
 Julian Tear – violin
 Jonathan Truscott – violin
 Helen Tunstall – harp
 Urban Voices Choir – choir
 Edward Vanderspar – viola
 Bozidar Vukotic – celli
 Lucy Waterhouse – violin
 Derek Watkins – trumpet
 Alistair White – trombone
 Pat White – trumpet
 Karl Willetts – choir
 Dave Williams – violin
 David Woodcock – violin
 Tony Woollard – celli

Charts and certifications

Weekly charts

Year-end charts

Decade-end charts

Certifications

Release history

References

2012 albums
Paloma Faith albums
Albums produced by Nellee Hooper
RCA Records albums